QCS may refer to:

Queen's Colour Squadron, a unit of the British Royal Air Force
Queensland Core Skills Test, a former year-12 standardised test in Queensland, Australia
Queensland Corrective Services, a Queensland Government department, Australia